Micrixalus elegans is a species of frog in the family Micrixalidae. It is endemic to the Western Ghats, India, and occurs between the Palakkad Gap and Goa Gap in the states of Kerala and Karnataka. Micrixalus elegans is one of the Micrixalus species showing "foot-flagging" behaviour, hence the common name elegant dancing frog has been proposed. Other common names include elegant torrent frog and elegant bush frog.

Description
Males measure  and females  in snout–vent length. The dorsum is uniformly reddish brown, with scattered yellowish grey spots. The sides of the head are distinctly dark blackish brown. The dorsal surfaces of the limbs are reddish brown with dark brown bands.

Males of this species show "foot-flagging" behaviour, stretching the entire hing leg away from the body, that they occasionally conduct, along with calling. Males may also engage in male-male combats, kicking each other.

Habitat and conservation
Its natural habitats are tropical moist lowland forests and rivers. It prefers damp leaf litter by fast-flowing forest streams.

This species was for a long time only known from the holotype, which is probably lost. However, it was rediscovered in 2010 and found to be relatively common; the small adult size of this species might have led researchers to mistake them as juveniles of another species. Classified as "data deficient" before its rediscovery, the species is now know from several localities, some of them in or near protected areas.

References

External links 

elegans
Amphibians described in 1937
Frogs of India
Endemic fauna of the Western Ghats
Taxa named by C. R. Narayan Rao
Taxonomy articles created by Polbot